Nobodies is an American comedy television series created by Hugh Davidson, Larry Dorf and Rachel Ramras, and produced by Ben Falcone and Melissa McCarthy. The series also starred Davidson, Dorf and Ramras. The series premiered on TV Land on March 29, 2017. The second season premiered on Paramount Network on March 29, 2018. On June 23, 2018, Nobodies was cancelled after two seasons by TV Land.

Plot
Groundlings members Hugh, Larry and Rachel are three actor/comedians still waiting for their big break, struggling to make a name for themselves in Hollywood while their friends achieve fame and fortune. They’re the Nobodies.

Cast

Main
 Hugh Davidson as a fictionalised version of himself
 Larry Dorf as a fictionalised version of himself
 Rachel Ramras as a fictionalised version of herself

Guest stars
Celebrity guest stars who appear as themselves throughout the series include: Melissa McCarthy, Ben Falcone, Jason Bateman, Kristen Bell, Stephanie Courtney, Nat Faxon, Cheryl Hines, Allison Janney, Annie Mumolo, Bob Odenkirk, Jim Rash, Maya Rudolph, Sia, Michaela Watkins and Kristen Wiig.

Production
On June 2, 2016, the series was picked up for a first season. On January 13, 2017, the series was renewed for a second season. On November 15, 2017, it was announced that the series would move to TV Land's sister network Paramount Network, starting with the second season, which premiered on March 29, 2018. It returned to TV Land after two weeks (Paramount Network had delayed Heathers to the summer before eventually burning the series off in a heavily redacted and edited form in the fall, effectively stunting promotion of the network move with no original programming the night before on Wednesdays).

Series overview

Episodes
With the exception of the pilot, all episodes were written by Hugh Davidson, Larry Dorf, Rachel Ramras & Michael McDonald with the teleplay by Hugh Davidson, Larry Dorf, Rachel Ramras and directed by Michael McDonald.  The pilot was only written by Hugh Davidson, Larry Dorf, Rachel Ramras and directed by Ben Falcone.

Season 1 (2017)

Season 2 (2018)

Reception

Critical response
Nobodies has received positive reviews from critics. Rotten Tomatoes awarded the series with a rating of 70% based on reviews from 10 critics and an average rating of 6.0 out of 10. On Metacritic, the series received a score of 60% based on reviews from 12 critics, indicating "mixed or average reviews".

Nobodies made its pre-television premiere at the SXSW Festival, and received early praise. Variety TV critic Sonia Saraiya called it funny and original, writing, "The show succeeds because of how fully it comes down on its three leads, who separately and together are not much above using any possible in to get their projects made."

Ratings

Season 1 (2017)

Season 2 (2018)

References

External links
 

2010s American single-camera sitcoms
2017 American television series debuts
2018 American television series endings
English-language television shows
Paramount Network original programming
Television shows set in Los Angeles
TV Land original programming